The Winkler Flyers are a Manitoba Junior Hockey League team playing out of the Winkler Arena in Winkler, Manitoba, Canada. The Flyers entered the MJHL as an expansion team for the 1980-81 season and have won three Turnbull Cup Championships as Manitoba Junior 'A' Champions (1991, 1992, & 1998) as well as the ANAVET Cup in 1992.

National Hockey League players to have played for the Flyers include Hall of Fame goaltender Eddie "The Eagle" Belfour.

Winkler native Eric Fehr serves as director of player development. After a 17-year professional playing career, the Calder Cup, Spengler Cup and Stanley Cup champion brings a wealth of knowledge and experience to Flyers players and prospects.

List of Championships

Season-by-season record
Note: GP = Games Played, W = Wins, L = Losses, T = Ties, OTL = Overtime Losses, GF = Goals for, GA = Goals against

Playoffs
1981 DNQ
1982 Lost Quarter-final
Dauphin Kings defeated Winkler Flyers 4-games-to-2
1983 Lost Semi-final
Winkler Flyers defeated Selkirk Steelers 4-games-to-3
Dauphin Kings defeated Winkler Flyers 4-games-to-2
1984 Lost Quarter-final
Selkirk Steelers defeated Winkler Flyers 4-games-to-1
1985 Lost Semi-final
Winkler Flyers defeated Dauphin Kings 4-games-to-3
Selkirk Steelers defeated Winkler Flyers 4-games-to-1
1986 Lost Semi-final
Winkler Flyers defeated Steinbach Hawks 4-games-to-none
Selkirk Steelers defeated Winkler Flyers 4-games-to-2
1987 Lost Quarter-final
Selkirk Steelers defeated Winkler Flyers 4-games-to-2
1988 Lost Quarter-final
Dauphin Kings defeated Winkler Flyers 4-games-to-1
1989 Lost Quarter-final
Dauphin Kings defeated Winkler Flyers 4-games-to-2
1990 Lost Quarter-final
Portage Terriers defeated Winkler Flyers 4-games-to-1
1991 Won League, Lost Anavet Cup
Winkler Flyers defeated Selkirk Steelers
Winkler Flyers defeated Dauphin Kings 4-games-to-1
Winkler Flyers defeated Winnipeg South Blues 4-games-to-none MJHL CHAMPIONS
Yorkton Terriers (SJHL) defeated Winkler Flyers 4-games-to-1
1992 Won League, Won Anavet Cup, Lost 1992 Centennial Cup final
Winkler Flyers defeated Selkirk Steelers
Winkler Flyers defeated Portage Terriers 4-games-to-1
Winkler Flyers defeated St. James Canadians 4-games-to-1 MJHL CHAMPIONS
Winkler Flyers defeated Melfort Mustangs (SJHL) 4-games-to-1 ANAVET CUP CHAMPIONS
Fourth in 1992 Centennial Cup round robin (2-2)
Winkler Flyers defeated Vernon Lakers (BCHL) 5-2 in semi-final
Thunder Bay Flyers (USHL) defeated Winkler Flyers 10-1 in final
1993 Lost Quarter-final
Dauphin Kings defeated Winkler Flyers 4-games-to-3
1994 Lost Final
Winkler Flyers defeated Portage Terriers 4-games-to-1
Winkler Flyers defeated Dauphin Kings 4-games-to-3
St. Boniface Saints defeated Winkler Flyers 4-games-to-2
1995 Lost Final
Winkler Flyers defeated Dauphin Kings 4-games-to-3
Winkler Flyers defeated Neepawa Natives 4-games-to-3
Winnipeg South Blues defeated Winkler Flyers 4-games-to-2
1996 Lost Quarter-final
Dauphin Kings defeated Winkler Flyers 4-games-to-1
1997 Lost Semi-final
Winkler Flyers defeated Neepawa Natives 4-games-to-3
OCN Blizzard defeated Winkler Flyers 4-games-to-none
1998 Won League, Lost Anavet Cup
Winkler Flyers defeated Neepawa Natives 4-games-to-1
Winkler Flyers defeated OCN Blizzard 4-games-to-1
Winkler Flyers defeated St. James Canadians 4-games-to-1 MJHL CHAMPIONS
Weyburn Red Wings (SJHL) defeated Winkler Flyers 4-games-to-3
1999 Lost Semi-final
Winkler Flyers defeated Portage Terriers 4-games-to-2
OCN Blizzard defeated Winkler Flyers 4-games-to-1
2000 Lost Semi-final
Winkler Flyers defeated St. James Canadians 4-games-to-3
Winnipeg South Blues defeated Winkler Flyers 4-games-to-1
2001 Lost Final
Winkler Flyers defeated Selkirk Steelers 4-games-to-1
Winkler Flyers defeated Winnipeg South Blues 4-games-to-none
OCN Blizzard defeated Winkler Flyers 4-games-to-none
2002 Lost Final
Winkler Flyers defeated Selkirk Steelers 4-games-to-1
Winkler Flyers defeated St. James Canadians 4-games-to-none
OCN Blizzard defeated Winkler Flyers 4-games-to-none
2003 Lost Quarter-final
Southeast Blades defeated Winkler Flyers 4-games-to-3
2004 Lost Quarter-final
Winnipeg Saints defeated Winkler Flyers 4-games-to-2
2005 Lost Quarter-final
Winnipeg South Blues defeated Winkler Flyers 4-games-to-1
2006 Lost Quarter-final
Winnipeg South Blues defeated Winkler Flyers 4-games-to-1
2007 Lost Quarter-final
Selkirk Steelers defeated Winkler Flyers 4-games-to-1
2008 Lost Semi-final
Winkler Flyers defeated Selkirk Steelers 4-games-to-1
Winnipeg Saints defeated Winkler Flyers 4-games-to-1
2009 Lost Quarter-final
Selkirk Steelers defeated Winkler Flyers 4-games-to-2
2010 Lost Semi-final
Winkler Flyers defeated Selkirk Steelers 4-games-to-2
Winnipeg Saints defeated Winkler Flyers 4-games-to-none
2011 Lost Semi-final
Winkler Flyers defeated Waywayseecappo Wolverines 4-games-to-2
Selkirk Steelers defeated Winkler Flyers 4-games-to-2
2012 Lost Quarter-final
Winnipeg Blues defeated Winkler Flyers 4-games-to-0
2013 Lost Quarter-final
Winnipeg Blues defeated Winkler Flyers 4-games-to-2
2014 Lost Survivor series
Winnipeg Blues defeated Winkler Flyers 2-games-to-0
2015 Lost Quarter-final
Virden Oil Capitals defeated Winkler Flyers 4-games-to-2
2016 Lost Semi-final
Winkler Flyers defeated OCN Blizzard 4-games-to-1
Steinbach Pistons defeated Winkler Flyers 4-games-to-3
2017 Lost Semi-final
Winkler Flyers defeated Virden Oil Capitals 4-games-2
OCN Blizzard defeated winkler Flyers 4-games-0
2018 Lost Semi-final
Winkler Flyers defeated OCN Blizzard 4-games-to-2
Virden Oil Capitals defeated Winkler Flyers 4-games-to-0
2019 DNQ
2020 Playoffs cancelled
Virden Oil Capitals leading Winkler Flyers 2-games-to-1 when playoffs were cancelled due to COVID-19 pandemic2021 Playoffs cancelled2022 Lost Semi-finalWinkler Flyers defeated Winnipeg Blues 4-games-to-2Dauphin Kings defeated Winkler Flyers 4-games-to-1''

See also
List of ice hockey teams in Manitoba

References

External links
Winkler Flyers website

Manitoba Junior Hockey League teams
Sport in Winkler, Manitoba
1980 establishments in Manitoba
Ice hockey clubs established in 1980